Chak 236 GB Kilanwala (Urdu چک نمبر 236 گ ب کلیانوالہ)  (کوٹ دیا کشن ) is a Pakistani Punjab union council located  from Jaranwala toward the east side on Jaranwala-Nankana Road in Jaranwala Tehsil of the Faislabad district, previously known as Lyallpur Punjab Pakistan. Before the Partition of India, most of the population was Sikh and Hindu; after the Partition, Muslims migrated from the villages of Anihar, Nangal Fateh Khan, and other villages in Jalandhar, India. "GB" refers to the Gugera Branch Canal that irrigates the nearby agricultural Land of Punjab.

Population and area

According to the 2017 census, the total population of the village is 4360. Most of the population is Muslim Barelvi (with a minority being Christian), and is composed of the Khan, Rajput, and Arain castes.

The total agricultural land area is 647.488 hectares.

Most people follow the Chishti order of Sufism. There are three mosques and one small church in this village. Every year, people in the village emigrate to Jaranwala and Faisalabad.

100% percent of the population speaks Punjabi, but most of them also understand and speak Urdu. Some also speak English.

Transportation
There is a daily bus service from Jaranwala GTS bus station from 236 GB to Chak 233 GB Kot Barseer. The nearby railway station is the Kot Daya Kishen railway station (Urdu کوٹ دیا کشن).

See also
Government Islamia High School Jaranwala

References

Villages in Faisalabad District